Highway 2A may refer to:

Canada
 Alberta Highway 2A
 Ontario Highway 2A (former)

India
  National Highway 2A (India)

United States
 U.S. Route 2A
 New England Route 2A (former)
 Connecticut Route 2A
 Massachusetts Route 2A
 Nevada State Route 2A
New York State Route 2A (mid-1920s–1927)
New York State Route 2A (1930–1939)
New York State Route 2A (1939 – early 1940s)
 Vermont Route 2A

Territories
 Guam Highway 2A